Thames foot tunnel may refer to the following tunnels under the River Thames in London:
Woolwich foot tunnel, between Woolwich and North Woolwich
Greenwich Foot Tunnel, between Greenwich and Millwall
Thames Tunnel, between Wapping and Rotherhithe, used as a pedestrian tunnel before 1869

See also
Tunnels underneath the River Thames